South Africa – Sri Lanka relations refers to the current and historical relations between South Africa and Sri Lanka. The Government of South Africa established its resident diplomatic Mission in Colombo in September 2007. HE Sirisena Amarasekara is the current Sri Lankan High Commissioner to South Africa while HE Ms RP Marks is the current South African High Commissioner to Sri Lanka.

History
Both countries of South Africa and Sri Lanka were part of the  Dutch and  British Empires. Sri Lanka (then Ceylon) was a Dutch colony from 1658 - 1796 and a British colony from 1815 - 1948 while South Africa (mainly the Dutch Cape colony) was a Dutch colony from 1652 - 1806 and a British colony (including other parts of South Africa) from 1806 - 1910. The relations of both South Africa and Ceylon would've happened during the two periods of colonialism.

During the Dutch colonial period in the 17th and 18th centuries, the Dutch brought slaves from Ceylon. The slaves got there from voyages sponsored by the Dutch East India Company (VOC) where they sent slave ships from the Cape which their 'return' fleet sailed from Ceylon, the Dutch East Indies and back to the Netherlands and those fleets would stop at the Cape on their way home. The Ceylonese who went on these fleets came as personal slaves. In the early 18th century, majority of the slaves in the Cape were from India and Ceylon. The slaves mixed in with the population and the descendants could be seen with the Cape Malays and Cape Coloured.

Sri Lanka established diplomatic relations on 12 September 1994 following the end of Apartheid and the election of Nelson Mandela to the new Government of South Africa of its post Apartheid period.

Visits
The President of South Africa, Jacob Zuma, visited Sri Lanka to participate in the Commonwealth Heads of Government Meeting 2013 in Colombo. The President of Sri Lanka Mahinda Rajapaksa, visited South Africa in December 2013 to participate in the funeral of former President of South Africa Nelson Mandela.

References

External links
 Sri Lankan High Commission in South Africa

 
Sri Lanka
Bilateral relations of Sri Lanka
Sri Lanka and the Commonwealth of Nations
Sri Lanka